Wuileixis de Jesus Rivas Espinoza (born August 27, 1990 in Caracas, Capital District) is a Greco-Roman wrestler from Venezuela who competes in the welterweight category (under 66 kg). At the 2012 Olympics he received a bye for the preliminary round of sixteen match, before losing to French wrestler and defending Olympic champion Steeve Guénot, who was able to score one point each in two straight periods, leaving Rivas without a single point. At the 2016 Rio Games he was also eliminated in the first bout, against Omid Norouzi who was the defending champion from London.

He won the bronze medal in his event at the 2022 South American Games held in Asunción, Paraguay.

References

External links

 
 RIVAS ESPINOZA, Wuileixis de Jesus at NBC 2012 Olympics

1990 births
Living people
Venezuelan male sport wrestlers
Olympic wrestlers of Venezuela
Wrestlers at the 2012 Summer Olympics
Wrestlers at the 2016 Summer Olympics
Sportspeople from Caracas
Pan American Games medalists in wrestling
Pan American Games gold medalists for Venezuela
Wrestlers at the 2015 Pan American Games
Wrestlers at the 2019 Pan American Games
Medalists at the 2015 Pan American Games
Medalists at the 2019 Pan American Games
Pan American Wrestling Championships medalists
20th-century Venezuelan people
21st-century Venezuelan people